Alexander Donaldson Torrance (29 September 1901 – 14 April 1941) was a Scottish footballer who played as a left half.

Career
Alexander "Sandy" Torrance initially played locally with Renfrew juniors. Joe Palmer signed Torrance in June 1921 for Bristol City.
Torrance played alongside Bert Neesam and had a benefit match v Gillingham on 15 January 1927 in which Tot Walsh scored 6 goals in a 9–4 win although Torrance himself did not play. Torrance joined Bath City in July 1928. A Fire Guard in the Second World War, Sandy Torrance died on 14 April 1941 after injury in an air raid on Bedminster, Bristol on 11 April 1941.

Honours
with Bristol City
Football League Third Division South winner: 1922–23

References

1901 births
1941 deaths
British civilians killed in World War II
Footballers from Glasgow
Scottish footballers
English Football League players
Bath City F.C. players
Bristol City F.C. players
Association football midfielders
Deaths by airstrike during World War II